Shringarpur is a small village in Ratnagiri district, Konkan, Maharashtra state, India. It is one of the base villages for the trek to Prachitgad.

The jagir of Shringarpur was originally held by a family belonging to the Surve clan. According to their lore, their ancestor was Shyam Singh (also known as Ajit Singh), a Rajput from Udaipur. In 14th century, he came to Deogiri, where he served the Yadava dynasty of Deogiri. Later, he changed his alliance to the Bahmani Sultanate, and was given the Shringarpur jagir. He was also given the title "Shurvir", which later got corrupted to "Surve".

References 

Villages in Ratnagiri district